The 1952 French Championships (now known as the French Open) was a tennis tournament that took place on the outdoor clay courts at the Stade Roland-Garros in Paris, France. The tournament ran from 20 May until 2 June. It was the 56th staging of the French Championships, and the second Grand Slam tennis event of 1952. Jaroslav Drobný and Doris Hart won the singles titles.

Finals

Men's singles

 Jaroslav Drobný defeated  Frank Sedgman  6–2, 6–0, 3–6, 6–4

Women's singles

 Doris Hart defeated  Shirley Fry  6–4, 6–4

Men's doubles

 Ken McGregor /  Frank Sedgman  defeated  Gardnar Mulloy /  Dick Savitt  6–3, 6–4, 6–4

Women's doubles

 Doris Hart /  Shirley Fry defeated  Hazel Redick-Smith /  Julia Wipplinger 7–5, 6–1

Mixed doubles

 Doris Hart /  Frank Sedgman defeated  Shirley Fry /  Eric Sturgess  6–8, 6–3, 6–3

References

External links
 French Open official website

French Championships
French Championships (tennis) by year
French Championships (tennis)
French Championships (tennis)
French Championships (tennis)
French Championships (tennis)